Salenski's shrew (Chodsigoa salenskii) is a red-toothed shrew found only in northern Sichuan, China, where it is known from Wolong National Nature Reserve.

References

Red-toothed shrews
Mammals described in 1907